Gina Falckenberg (14 September 1907 – 12 February 1996) was a German stage and film actress. She appeared in 22 films during her career, including Anime in tumult (1942). Falckenberg was also a writer and worked on several screenplays. She was married to the Italian actor Giulio del Torre.

Selected filmography

Actress
 A Man with Heart (1932)
 Raid in St. Pauli (1932)
 Holiday From Myself (1934)
 The Gypsy Baron (1935)
 The Impossible Woman (1936)
 The Accusing Song (1936)
 Love's Awakening (1936)
 The Voice of the Heart (1937)
 After Midnight (1938)
 Souls in Turmoil (1942)
 Crossroads of Passion (1948)
 Women Without Names (1950)

Screenwriter
 My Father, the Actor (1956)
 The Hero of My Dreams (1960)
 I Will Always Be Yours (1960)

References

External links

Further reading 
 

1907 births
1996 deaths
German film actresses
German women screenwriters
German emigrants to Italy
People from Fürstenfeldbruck (district)
20th-century German actresses
German stage actresses
Film people from Bavaria
20th-century German screenwriters